The Haryana women's football team is an Indian women's football team representing Haryana in the Senior Women's National Football Championship. They reached the semi-finals at the 2015–16 Senior Women's National Football Championship held at Jabalpur before losing to the eventual runners-up Manipur.

Haryana's junior team were the runners-up of the National Junior Girls’ Football tournament 2010–11 held at Chandigarh while, their sub-junior team were the runners-up of the National Sub-Junior Girls’ Football tournament 2014–15 held at Cuttack.

Honours
National Games
 Bronze medal (1): 2015

 Junior Girl's National Football Championship
 Runners-up (1): 2010–11

 Sub–Junior Girl's National Football Championship
 Runners-up (1): 2014–15

References

Football in Haryana
Women's football teams in India
Year of establishment missing